David Penchyna Grub (born 10 March 1965) is a Mexican politician affiliated with the Institutional Revolutionary Party. He currently serves as Senator of the LXII Legislature of the Mexican Congress representing Hidalgo. He also served as Deputy during two Legislatures, between 2000 until 2003 and from 2009 until 2012.

References

External links
   Official website of David Penchyna Grub

1965 births
Living people
Politicians from Pachuca, Hidalgo
Members of the Senate of the Republic (Mexico)
Members of the Chamber of Deputies (Mexico)
Institutional Revolutionary Party politicians
21st-century Mexican politicians
National Autonomous University of Mexico alumni